Guy Green may refer to:

 Guy Green (filmmaker) (1913–2005), British director and Oscar-winning cinematographer
 Guy Green (judge) (born 1937), Governor of Tasmania, 1995–2003